Krzycko Małe  is a village in the administrative district of Gmina Święciechowa, within Leszno County, Greater Poland Voivodeship, in west-central Poland.

Famous writer and poet of Polish renaissance, Primate of Poland Andreas Cricius was born there in 1482.

References

Villages in Leszno County